Gorata is a place in Bidar district of Karnataka, India. In 1948, the youth of Gorata wanted to hoist the Indian flag.  The village was ruled by the Nizam of Hyderabad. The Nizam didn't want to accede the Hyderabad region to India but rather wanted an independent nation for which he had set up a militia known as the Razakars with an objective to prevent an accession to India.

A few villagers had hoisted the Indian flag and sang Vande Mataram at Gorata. This flustered the Nizam and he ordered the Razakars to attack the whole village. On 9 May 1948, at around 8:00 AM, their hamlet was encircled by Razakars. They killed  several villagers. The whole village was set afire and plundered.

Kanaiyalal Maneklal Munshi, the agent of India to Hyderabad in his book, The End of an Era, describes the massacre. He described that half burnt bodies were found lying in fields and the stench was unbearable. According to Munshi's report over 200 people were killed and loss was estimated at 70 lakhs. Post this report, Sardar Vallabhbhai Patel called for police action. The Razakars and Nizam army had surrendered within a couple of days after some police action.

References

Villages in Bidar district